Sally Erana Martin (born 28 May 1985) is an actress from New Zealand. She has appeared in a range of television series, including The Strip, Shortland Street and in Power Rangers Ninja Storm as Tori Hanson, the latter two co-starring with Pua Magasiva.

Martin has also worked in several other shows such as Seven Periods with Mr Gormsby, The Killian Curse and in the TV movie Murder in Greenwich.

Early life
Born in Wellington, Martin attended Chilton St. James School, where she performed in numerous festivals and productions including the national Sheilah Winn Shakespeare Festival, the New Zealand College Theatresports competition and a variety of school plays.

Career
Martin started acting in 2001, at the age of 15, in The Strip as Gemma. In 2002, she appeared in  Revelations as Annie, followed by Power Rangers Ninja Storm as Tori Hanson, the first female Blue Ranger, in 2003. After that, Martin filmed the movie Murder in Greenwich. In 2006, Martin acquired the part of Tory in Wendy Wu: Homecoming Warrior. In 2007, she appeared in Welcome to Paradise as Sasha in 2007 and since 2009 she has played Nurse Nicole Miller in Shortland Street. On September 23, 2019, she celebrated 10 years with the show. In 2015, she created a video for the #MyBodyMyTerms campaign.

Filmography

Video games
2003- Power Rangers Ninja Storm (voice) ... as Blue Wind Ranger

References

External links
 

1985 births
Living people
New Zealand television actresses
21st-century New Zealand actresses
Actresses from Wellington City
New Zealand soap opera actresses